Namkha may refer to:
Namkha, a Tibetan structure
Namkha, Laos, a village in Laos
Namkha, Nepal, a rural municipality in Nepal